Pain Rokh Rural District is a rural district (dehestan) in Jolgeh Rokh District, Torbat-e Heydarieh County, Razavi Khorasan Province, Iran. At the 2006 census, its population was 10,156, in 2,458 families.  The rural district has 20 villages.

References 

Rural Districts of Razavi Khorasan Province
Torbat-e Heydarieh County